Starksia sluiteri, the chessboard blenny, is a species of labrisomid blenny native to the Caribbean Sea and the Atlantic Ocean along the coast of Brazil including Atol das Rocas and St. Paul's Rocks. This species is an inhabitant of reefs where it prefers areas with rubble or crevices in which to hide. This species can reach a length of  SL. The specific name honours the Dutch biologist and anatomist Carel Philip Sluiter (1854-1933), a specialist in tunicates.

References

sluiteri
Taxa named by Jan Marie Metzelaar
Fish described in 1919